Gershom Frederick Parnell (26 September 1883–1960) was an English footballer who played in the Football League for Derby County, Leeds City and Preston North End.

References

1883 births
1960 deaths
English footballers
Association football forwards
English Football League players
Pinxton F.C. players
Derby County F.C. players
Leeds City F.C. players
Exeter City F.C. players
Preston North End F.C. players
Mansfield Town F.C. players